Charlie Smith (born June 27, 1947) is a poet and novelist.  He has written seven novels and seven books of poetry. He has won the Aga Khan Prize, the Levinson prize, the J. Howard and Barbara M.J. Wood prize, a Guggenheim Fellowship, and a grant from the National Endowment for the Arts. His writing has appeared in magazines and journals such as The New Yorker, The Paris Review, Harper's, The New Republic, the New York Times, and The Nation. He lives in New York City and Key West.

Books of poetry include:
 Demo
 Jump Soul
 Word Comix
 Women of America
 Heroin and Other Poems
 Before and After
 The Palms
 Indistinguishable from the Darkness
 Red Roads
Novels include:
 Men in Miami Hotels
 Three Delays
 Cheap Ticket to Heaven
 Chimney Rock
 The Lives of the Dead
 Shine Hawk
 Canaan
He has also written a book of three novellas entitled Crystal River.

References

Living people
1947 births
American male poets
American male novelists
Place of birth missing (living people)
Writers from New York City
Poets from New York (state)
20th-century American poets
20th-century American novelists
20th-century American male writers
Novelists from New York (state)